Nawab Mir Khudrath Nawaz Jung Bahadur (1896–1971) was a Hyderabadi aristocrat and dignitary. He held various official positions in the Nizam Osman Ali Khan's Durbar, the Hyderabad State Forces and Administration Offices.

Early life and family
Nawab Mir Khudrath Nawaz Jung Bahadur was the youngest son of Nawab Mir Jahangir Ali Khan Bahadur, Jahangir Jung Bahadur. Jahangir Jung died in Hyderabad, before 9 November 1915. He was the maternal grandson of Nawab Roshan-ud-Daulah Bahadur, who was the youngest son of Nasir-ud-Daulah, Asif Jah IV, and brother of The V Nizam of Hyderabad Afzal-ud-Daulah of the Asaf Jahi family of Hyderabad state. His elder sister was Sahebzadi Azam unnisa Begum (Dulhan Pasha Begum), the first legally wedded wife of the 7th Nizam Mir Osman Ali Khan in the April,1906(19 safar,1324 Hijri). He was the first brother-in-law of Nizam VII Mir Osman Ali Khan and the maternal uncle of Azam Jah, Moazzam Jah, and Shehzadi Pasha.

His education was given privately by English speaking teachers and professors. He was given military training to learn various arts and technique of military officers in command to serve the Nizam's Army Forces.

Official ranks
 Joined State Police Intelligence (1916) 
 Deputy Commander of Nizam's Irregular Forces (1919)
 Assistant Nazim of the Sarf-e-Khas (1922)
 Commissioner of State Customs (1927)
 Commander in Chief of Nizam's Irregular Forces (1929)
 Chairman of Madrasa-i-Aliya (1955)

Awards and honors
 Delhi Durbar Medal (1911)

Personal life
Mir Khudrath Nawaz Jung married five women from aristocratic Muslim families of the Hyderabad state, with whom he had fourteen children.

He was a poet in Persian and was very fond of playing shikar. His weapons collection included pieces from Holland & Holland, Bellona Arsenal, Noble Bros. & Co.

References

1936 Hyderabad directory

1896 births
1971 deaths